Brian Lee Dunsworth (May 4, 1925 – December 4, 2014) was a Canadian football player who played for the Edmonton Eskimos. He previously played junior football in Edmonton.

References

1925 births
2014 deaths
Canadian football running backs
Edmonton Elks players
Players of Canadian football from Alberta
Canadian football people from Edmonton